Sheila Sherwood (born Sheila Hilary Parkin, 22 October 1945 in Parson Cross, Sheffield, West Riding of Yorkshire, England) is a former international long jumper whose career highlights included a silver medal at the 1968 Summer Olympics in Mexico, and a gold medal at the 1970 British Commonwealth Games in Edinburgh. She competed in three consecutive Summer Olympic Games (1964, 1968 and 1972) and had a career best distance of 6.73 metres.

Early life
As a child, her parents were caretaker and head cook at St Thomas More School in nearby Grenoside.

Sherwood attended Yew Lane Secondary Modern, where at the age of fifteen she was appointed as Head-Girl. After a successful set of O-Level results, she transferred to nearby Ecclesfield Grammar School to study for her A-Levels.

Athletics career
She first came to prominence as an athlete as a 16-year-old as a member of the Sheffield-based Sheffield United Harriers athletic club. Competing under her maiden name of Sheila Parkin, she created an English Schools long jump record in the summer of 1962. On the strength of this she was selected to represent Great Britain against Poland in August 1962 where she finished second behind former world record holder Elzbieta Krzensinska by just 2 cm. This performance started her long and distinguished career as an international long jumper, as it resulted in selection for the 1962 European championships in Belgrade, where she finished 12th, and then representing England in the long jump at the 1962 Commonwealth Games in Perth, Western Australia, where she achieved 5th position.

Sherwood's early career saw only a slight improvement in her jumping, and she was eclipsed by fellow British jumper Mary Rand on many occasions. Rand took the gold medal at the 1964 Tokyo Olympic Games where Sherwood only finished 13th. However, it was in Tokyo that Sheila met British hurdler John Sherwood and a romance began that was to result in marriage three years later. Sheila's relationship with John coincided with a marked improvement in her jumping performances. She took the silver medal at the 1966 Commonwealth Games in Kingston, Jamaica behind Rand and at the 1968 Olympic Games in Mexico City she took the silver medal behind the Romanian Viorica Viscopoleanu with a personal best leap of 6.68 metres.

Sherwood took the gold medal at the 1970 Commonwealth Games in Edinburgh with a career best jump of 6.73 metres and finished fourth at the 1971 European Championships in Helsinki. However, in her latter years in the sport she was hindered by back problems. Despite this she was selected for the 1972 Olympic Games in Munich where she finished a commendable ninth. Her career as an international long jumper came to a conclusion at the 1974 Commonwealth Games in Auckland where she took seventh place.

Retirement and personal life
In the mid-1970s Sherwood and her husband helped form the breakaway Sheffield Athletic Club, which then amalgamated with Sheffield United Harriers to form Sheffield City Athletic Club. The club later changed its name to the City of Sheffield Athletic Club.

Sherwood is the mother of British international tennis player David Sherwood who was born in 1980. After retiring from athletics she continued to work as a physical education teacher at Myers Grove Comprehensive School in Sheffield.

References

1945 births
Living people
Sportspeople from Sheffield
British female long jumpers
English female long jumpers
Olympic athletes of Great Britain
Olympic silver medallists for Great Britain
Commonwealth Games medallists in athletics
Athletes (track and field) at the 1964 Summer Olympics
Athletes (track and field) at the 1968 Summer Olympics
Athletes (track and field) at the 1972 Summer Olympics
English Olympic medallists
Commonwealth Games gold medallists for England
Commonwealth Games silver medallists for England
Athletes (track and field) at the 1962 British Empire and Commonwealth Games
Athletes (track and field) at the 1966 British Empire and Commonwealth Games
Athletes (track and field) at the 1970 British Commonwealth Games
Athletes (track and field) at the 1974 British Commonwealth Games
Medalists at the 1968 Summer Olympics
Olympic silver medalists in athletics (track and field)
People educated at Ecclesfield Grammar School
Universiade medalists in athletics (track and field)
Universiade gold medalists for Great Britain
Medalists at the 1967 Summer Universiade
Medallists at the 1966 British Empire and Commonwealth Games
Medallists at the 1970 British Commonwealth Games